Conceição da Feira is a municipality in the state of Bahia in the North-East region of Brazil.

Neighborhoods

Centro
Santa Luzia (Baixinha)
Pinheiro
Recanto do Paraguaçu
Rocinha
Conceição Velha

References

Municipalities in Bahia